Squatterz (2012) is a television series of three young adult (Buchi, Papa and Danjuma) who were squatting in a friend's (Sege) apartment, the series centers around their daily experience living together as Squatters

The production was written by Seun Arowojolu and Kayode Obayemi and was directed by Seun Arowojolu. The series was done by Contentgram Studios Africa

Casts 
Stanley Chibunna (Funnybone) as Buchi
 Femi Amusan as Sege
 Ovy jabojo as Raymond
 Big Tony Ogbetere as papa
 Zikky Alloy as Danjuma
 Stephanie Zibili as flora
 Lord Frank as Esiri
 Sitsofe Tsikor as Dorothy
 Bella Duve as shelly

See also 

2014 Africa Magic Viewers' Choice Awards

References 

ONTV Nigeria original programming
2010s Nigerian television series
2012 Nigerian television series debuts
Nigerian television series